Ève Luquet (born 6 September 1954 in Paris) is a stamp designer and engraver. She had been designing stamps for the Andorran French post and France since 1986.

Luquet graduated in  1981 from the École nationale supérieure des Beaux-Arts of Paris, where she learned the art of  engraving with stamp engraver Jacques Jubert. She engraves mainly landscapes and monuments.

In 1995, Luquet was awarded the  French Grand Prix de l'art philatélique for a stamp representing the bridge of Nyons.  The issue of Marianne du 14 Juillet series on 15 July 1997 was the first definitive stamp series for France to be created by a woman.

References

1954 births
Living people
20th-century French engravers
21st-century French engravers
French stamp designers
Women engravers
20th-century French women artists
21st-century French women artists
20th-century French printmakers
Women stamp designers
Women graphic designers
French women printmakers